Gareth Davies-Jones is a folk singer, songwriter and composer from County Down, Northern Ireland.  After finishing education in Newcastle, becoming based in Northumberland and turning professional in 2004, Davies-Jones has earned a living as a singer-songwriter.  More known on the "Christian scene" than the acoustic folk one, he has extensively toured the United Kingdom and Ireland.

Biography
Davies-Jones grew up on the shores of Belfast Lough, then moved to Newcastle University to complete his education.  After busking and performing in bands Davies-Jones turned professional in 2004.

In 2009 Davies-Jones provided the and performed a re-arrangement of the carol In the Bleak Midwinter for the documentary "The Budgerigar and the Prisoner", an award-winning Internet programme award at the Sony 2009 Awards by Clifton Diocese.

In 2015 Davies-Jones undertook an arts-funded residency called "The Seam" at the North of England Institute of Mining and Mechanical Engineers.  This enabled him to research books for mining stories, about which he was able to write songs.  The manual "Practical Coal Mining," in particular, inspired him to write a song of the same name.  Following the residency Davies-Jones conducted a tour called "The Seam."

In an interview in 2017 with Tony Cummings, Gareth Jones said being professional had been a hard road but he had made a living out of it.

To support the endangered curlew bird species for World Curlew Day on 21 April 2020, Davies-Jones composed and recorded the song More Than Memory.

References

Footnotes

Sources

 
 

Folk singers from Northern Ireland
Singer-songwriters from Northern Ireland
Northumberland
Year of birth missing (living people)
Living people